Jan Korte (born 5 April 1977) is a German politician. Born in Osnabrück, Lower Saxony, he represents The Left. Jan Korte has served as a member of the Bundestag from the state of Saxony-Anhalt since 2005.

Life 
After graduating from the Gymnasium Oesede in Georgsmarienhütte in 1997, Korte first completed his civilian service and in 1999 began studying political science, sociology and history at the University of Hanover, which he completed in 2005 as Magister Artium (M.A.). He became member of the bundestag after the 2005 German federal election. He is a member of the Committee on the Verification of Credentials, Immunities and Rules of Procedure. In his group he is the 1st Parliamentary Secretary.

He was re-elected in the 2021 federal election and joined the 20th Bundestag.

References

External links 

  
 Bundestag biography 

1977 births
Living people
Members of the Bundestag for Saxony-Anhalt
Members of the Bundestag 2021–2025
Members of the Bundestag 2017–2021
Members of the Bundestag 2013–2017
Members of the Bundestag 2009–2013
Members of the Bundestag 2005–2009
Members of the Bundestag for The Left